Mauritanian may refer to:
 Something of, from, or related to Mauritania, a country in northwest Africa
 A person from Mauritania, or of Mauritanian descent. For information about the Mauritanian people, see Demographics of Mauritania.
 Note that there is no language called "Mauritanian".  For Mauritania's official language, see Arabic.
 For the history of Mauritania, see History of Mauritania
 The Mauritanian, 2021 film directed by Kevin Macdonald

See also 
 

Language and nationality disambiguation pages
Mauritania